St. Demetrius' Church is a church in Drobonik, Berat County, Albania. It became a Cultural Monument of Albania in 1970.

References

Cultural Monuments of Albania
Churches in Berat